Galiveedu mandal is one of the 30 mandals in Annamayya district in the Indian state of Andhra Pradesh. It is a part of Rayachoti revenue division. The mandal used to be a part of Kadapa district and was made part of the newly formed Annamayya district on 4 April 2022.

References 

Mandals in Annamayya district